Anastasiya Ihorivna "Nastya" Petryk (born 4 May 2002) is a Ukrainian singer. She won the Junior Eurovision Song Contest 2012 with the song "Nebo", becoming the first Ukrainian entrant to win the competition.

Life and work

In 2009, at the age of 7, Anastasiya Petryk appeared on the second season of Ukraine's Got Talent with her older sister Viktoria "Vika" Petryk, who represented Ukraine in the Junior Eurovision Song Contest 2008, finishing in second place.

Although Anastasiya was only supporting her sister backstage, the judges invited her to sing a song with her sister Victoria. After singing "I Love Rock 'n' Roll", they were invited to take part in the show together, reaching the semi-finals. That year Anastasiya also won the first prize in the "Moloda Halychyna" and second prize in the "Black Sea Games 2009".

In 2010, at the International Popular Music competition "New Wave Junior 2010" held in Artek, Ukraine, Anastasiya won the first prize in the younger age group (8 to 12 years old). Her sister Viktoria won in the older age group.

In 2012, Petryk won the Junior Eurovision Song Contest 2012 with the song "Nebo". She set new records from both largest winning margin in Junior Eurovision with 138 points (35 points ahead of 2nd. place) and largest percentage of 12-point scores, being awarded 12 points by 8 out of 12 of the voting countries (excluding Ukraine itself).

In spring 2022, Petryk moved to the United States following the Russian invasion of Ukraine. Since moving to the United States, she currently lives in Philadelphia.

Discography

Singles

See also
Ukraine in the Junior Eurovision Song Contest
Junior Eurovision Song Contest 2012

References

External links
 Official site

Living people
2002 births
Junior Eurovision Song Contest entrants for Ukraine
Junior Eurovision Song Contest winners
Ukrainian child singers
English-language singers from Ukraine
21st-century Ukrainian women singers
Child pop musicians
Ukrainian expatriates in the United States
Ukrainian refugees